The 2018 Federation Cup also known as the Walton Federation Cup 2018 due to the sponsorship from Walton Group was the 30th edition of the tournament. Thirteeen teams completed. Dhaka Abahani was the winner of previous edition of the tournament. The winner earned a slot in the group stage of the 2019 AFC Cup.

Venue

Draw
The draw was held 20 October 2018 at BFF house Motijheel. The thirteen teams were divided into four groups and the top two teams from each group advanced to the quarter-finals.
 All 22 matches were played at Bangabandhu National Stadium, Dhaka
 Two matches of the group stage were played daily.
 All 22 matches were broadcast live on Channel 9

Prize money
 Champion got US$5960.
 Runner-Up got US$3576.

Group stages
 All matches will be played at Dhaka
 Time Listed are UTC+6:00.

Group A

Group B

Group C

Group D

Knockout stage
 Time listed are UTC+6:00
 All matches were held at Dhaka
 In the knockout stage, extra time and penalty shoot-out are used to decide the winner if necessary.

Bracket

Quarterfinals

Semifinals

Final

Goal scorers

References

Bangladesh Federation Cup
2018 in Bangladeshi football
2018 Asian domestic association football cups